Adrian Lindsay Gallagher (born 12 May 1946) is a former Australian rules footballer in the Victorian Football League.

Cricket
He was also an outstanding cricketer in his youth and received many offers to play in England, but preferred to stay in Melbourne over the Australian winter and play football for Carlton.

Football
Widely known as "Gags", he also went by the nickname "Golly" before he started to lose his mop of curly hair.

Carlton (under 19s)
Best and fairest player for the Carlton Under 19 team in 1963, he kicked one goal in the team's Grand Final win against the Essendon Under 19s, at Maddingley Park, in Bacchus Marsh, on 12 October 1963.

Carlton (First XVIII)
Gallagher made his debut for the Carlton First XVIII on 23 May 1964 (round 6), against St Kilda at the Junction Oval. He was a tenacious, courageous left-footer, renowned for fearlessly burrowing into dense packs and coming out with the ball.

Footscray
Under the short-lived VFL's "10-year rule", which allowed players with ten years' service at one club to move to another club without a clearance, Gallagher left Carlton and moved to Footscray at the beginning of the 1973 season.

North Melbourne
In 1976 he moved to North Melbourne, but only played one game

Notes

References
 McFarline, Peter, "Gallagher's Job: Manager says End was Mutual", The Age, (Thursday, 1 April 1971), p.28.

External links

 Adrian Gallagher at Blueseum
Life Membership of Carlton Cricket Club awarded to Adrian Gallagher
CricketArchive: Adrian Gallagher
 Adrian Gallagher: Boyles Football Photos.

1946 births
Australian rules footballers from Victoria (Australia)
Western Bulldogs players
North Melbourne Football Club players
Carlton Football Club players
Carlton Football Club Premiership players
John Nicholls Medal winners
Living people
Three-time VFL/AFL Premiership players